The Allison Challenge Trophy was an annual football match between an Edinburgh Select XI (a combination of Hearts and Hibs players) and a leading English Football League club.

History 

The Edinburgh Charities Committee invited a top English club each year to play an Edinburgh Select XI, which consisted of players from Hibernian and Heart of Midlohian, with all proceeds going to worthy causes. They alternated between Easter Road and Tynecastle Park as the match venue.

The trophy was donated by Mr William S. Allison, who was then chairman of the Edinburgh Charities Day Committee, ahead of the first meeting between Edinburgh and English opposition on August 5, 1944.

Hearts XI matches 

Prior to the Edinburgh Select XI matches, Tynecastle Park hosted charity matches between Heart of Midlothian XI and invited opposition while World War II was ongoing.

A charity match between Heart of Midlothian and Arsenal was played on August 2, 1941, with the purpose of raising money for the Scottish National War Memorial.

Another match in aid of the RAF Benevolent Fund and other war charities was played between a Hearts Select XI, which featured players of other  Scottish and English clubs (including Stanley Mortenson and Billy Liddell) against a Royal Air Forces XI on August 7, 1943.

Similar events 

The Festival Cup was contested for by an Edinburgh Select XI against German giants Bayern Munich in 1985. Edinburgh won 3–2 in the charity match at Tynecastle Park in front of a crowd of 10,000. The Select featured players from Heart of Midlothian, Hibernian, and Meadowbank Thistle.

A testimonial match for retired Hearts legend John Cumming was played against a North East XI. The North East XI was made up of players from Dundee, Dundee United, and St Mirren (Aberdeen were unavailable). An attendance of 6,000 saw Edinburgh beaten 3–4 on May 11, 1980.

Results

Total titles

References

External links 

Edinburgh football competitions
Defunct football cup competitions in Scotland
Scottish football friendly trophies
Charity events in the United Kingdom
Charity football matches
Recurring sporting events established in 1944
Recurring sporting events disestablished in 1963
1944 establishments in Scotland
1963 disestablishments in Scotland